The Melanesia Cup  is an association football championship played between the Melanesian football clubs. The first edition of the cup was held in 2014. The tournament used a round-robin format involving every team playing each other once at the tournaments location.

The 2015 edition was held in Vanuatu.

Winners
2014 (3 teams):  Solomon Warriors F.C. (1)
2015 (4 teams):  Solomon Warriors F.C. (2)

Wins by country

All-time table (Clubs)
 From 2014 to 2015.

All-time table (by countries)
 From 2014 to 2015.

See also
 Melanesia Cup

References

International association football competitions in Oceania